Marjorie Ritchie (29 March 1948 - 25 March 2015) was a Scottish animal researcher and animal surgeon known for her contribution as part of the pioneering team who cloned Dolly The Sheep.  She grew up in Edinburgh and became interested in animals through visiting a relative who worked in animal breeding research at the Roslin Institute.

Early life and education 
Ritchie grew up in Edinburgh with two brothers and attended various Schools, Corstorphine Primary, Granville and Forrester High School.  Her parents were Helen and James Fordyce.

She became interested in animals through visiting a relative who worked in animal breeding research at the Roslin Institute.

Career 
Ritchie worked for the Roslin Institute, Edinburgh University joining in 1966 at the age of 18, she retired in 2014 after 48 years of service.

Ritchie appeared on the BBC Sounds The Reunion radio programme  in 2012 along with fellow colleagues talking about the impact of Dolly the Sheep 15 years later.

Personal life 
She married Bill Ritchie who also worked as part of the 'Dolly Team' as an anaesthetist and embryologist.  Ritchie has been commemorated in a photography by Scottish Artist Wendy McMurdo alongside Anaesthetist John Bracken at the Scottish National Portrait Gallery.

References 

1948 births
2015 deaths
Scottish scientists
Scottish women scientists
Academics of the University of Edinburgh
Scientists from Edinburgh
Academics from Edinburgh
People educated at Forrester High School